South Carolina Highway 263 (SC 263) is a  state highway in the U.S. state of South Carolina. The highway connects Eastover with rural areas of Richland County.

Route description
SC 263 begins at an intersection with SC 764 (Main Street) in Eastover, Richland County. It travels to the northeast and leaves the city limits. The highway crosses Griffin Creek. Approximately  later, it intersects U.S. Route 601 (US 601; McCords Ferry Road). Farther to the northeast, it meets its northern terminus, an intersection with US 76/US 378 (Garners Ferry Road).

Major intersections

See also

References

External links

SC 263 at Virginia Highways' South Carolina Highways Annex

263
Transportation in Richland County, South Carolina